Yā Muhammad ( "O Muhammad") or "Yā Rasūl Allāh" ( "O Messenger of God") are Arabic expressions referring to the Islamic prophet Muhammad.

Definition
The phrase means "O Muhammad". The word yā indicates the vocative case, signifying direct address to a person. It is a common prefix used by Arabic speakers before personal names.

Use

It is used to seek intercession through the Prophet or his family, companions and venerated figures. The majority of its practitioners are Shia and Sufi. The vocative yā when used with Allāh is used to call upon God for help.

Mourning of Muharram
During the mourning of Muharram, spontaneous slogans of Ya Hussain, Ya Ali and Ya Rasulullah "Messenger of God!" are common. On such occasions, the slogans demonstrate support.

See also

References

Muhammad
Arabic words and phrases
Islamic terminology